Casey Jones (born May 30, 1968) is a Canadian ice hockey coach. He is currently the head coach at Clarkson, a position he has held since the 2011–12. Jones spent 20 years as an assistant coach before landing his first head coaching job, replacing George Roll at one of his former stops. Jones was born in Temiscaming, Quebec, Canada.

Career statistics

Head coaching record

References

External links

1968 births
Living people
Boston Bruins draft picks
Canadian ice hockey coaches
Clarkson Golden Knights men's ice hockey coaches
Cornell Big Red men's ice hockey players
People from Abitibi-Témiscamingue
Ice hockey people from Quebec
Canadian ice hockey centres